Wayne Allen Patrick (September 1, 1946 – March 23, 2010) was a professional American football running back for five seasons for the Buffalo Bills in both the American Football League and the National Football League. He was born in Gainesville, Florida. He settled in Amherst, a suburb of Buffalo after retiring from football and raised his family. He married Mary Richard and had four children Wayne JR, Melissa, Jadah, and Joel. He died on March 23, 2010, after a lengthy battle with heart and kidney disease.

References
 

1946 births
2010 deaths
Players of American football from Gainesville, Florida
American football running backs
Louisville Cardinals football players
Buffalo Bills players
American Football League players